Rishi Kot is a mountain of the Garhwal Himalaya in Uttarakhand India. Rishi Kot means “the Rishis’ fortress”. It is 134th joint highest located entirely within the Uttrakhand. Nanda Devi, is the highest mountain in this category. It lies 5.7 km SW of Changabang  its nearest higher neighbor and 7.1 km south of Dunagiri . Bethartoli  lies 13.4 km SW and 11.7 km SSE lies Nanda Devi .

Climbing history
In 1968 N.D.A. Khadakvasla venture in to the Nanda Devi Sanctuary in Kumaon Himalaya. Led by Ft. Lt. V.P. Singh. They climbed three different peaks in the Rhamani Glacier. One of them is Rishi Kot climbed by the third party led by Lt. Mohindra the other members in the team are Nanda, Bhasin, Randhawa, Roy, Sherpa Instructor Pasang Temba, Sherpa Mingma Wangdi and four porters they summits on June 14. The three peaks were named Dl, D2 and D3 by the expedition team D3 is already marked on the Survey of India Sheet 53 as Rishi Kot. 11

A Polish team climbed northwest face of Rishi Kot, on September 9, 1979. Tadeusz Karolczak and Ryszard Pawlowski  made the first ascent of northwest face of the ice-covered Rishi Kot (6236 meters, 20,460 feet). A technically difficult and steep, 5000 ft high wall. The alpine-style climb took them 16 hours to reach the summit, reaching ten P.M. The pair spent the night on the summit. Descending the next morning to Base Camp. Chris Bonington and Dougal Haston during their 1974 Changabang expedition attempted the impressive ice-face on the W side had nearly climbed but retreated several hundred meters below the summit. In 1978 the Brown University expedition also unsuccessfully attempted this face.

Glaciers and rivers
Ramani Glacier on the northern side and Rishikot Glacier and Changabang Glacier on the eastern side. All these glacier drains into Rishi Ganga. Rishi Ganga meets with Dhauli Ganga near Rini. Later Dhauli ganga met with Alaknanda at Vishnu Pryag. Alaknanda River is one of the main tributaries of river Ganga that later joins Bhagirathi River the other main tributaries of river Ganga at Dev Pryag and became Ganga there after.

Neighboring peaks
Neighboring peaks of Maiktoli: 
 Nanda Devi: 
 Trisul: 
 Changabang: 
 Devistan I: 
 Devtoli: 
 Maiktoli:

See also

 List of Himalayan peaks of Uttarakhand

References

Mountains of Uttarakhand
Six-thousanders of the Himalayas
Geography of Chamoli district